The Atherton Trading Company was formed in 1659; with Humphrey Atherton and John Winthrop, Governor of Connecticut at the helm.
 This partnership of merchants and investors included Simon Bradstreet, Daniel Denison, Elisha Hutchinson, Richard Smith and Boston traders; John Tinker, Amos Richardson and William Hudson. Edward Hutchinson joined and by 1661, Plymouth investors included Josiah Winslow, John Brown and Thomas Willet. Their land speculation in the Narragansett area of Rhode Island was at the expense of the Native American inhabitants.

Critics from the Colony of Rhode Island alleged that Humphrey Atherton had kept one signatory, the younger brother of Narragansett Indian sachem Pessicus (also known as Maussup), drunk for several days and took him to Boston in order to secure Atherton’s and his partners perceived "rights" to the land at little expense.

The company obtained a large tract of land north of Kingston,  of land on Boston Neck, above Wickford. The Commissioners of the New England Confederation were opposed to the dissenters in Rhode Island, and colluded with the Atherton Trading Company by imposing a heavy fine on the Niantic for an infraction by certain members of their tribe. This event became known as the Atherton Purchase.
 The company acquired title after the Native American inhabitants defaulted on the loan. The purchase violated the jurisdiction of Rhode Island.

In 1660, commissioners of the New England Confederation, of whom John Winthrop, Jr. was one, transferred ownership of the mortgage of Pessicus's land to the Atherton Trading Company for 735 fathoms of Wampum. The company then foreclosed on the mortgage.  The land included the Narragansett property within the bounds of the Colony of Rhode Island. Rhode Island found this transference of land to be illegal and prevented the resale for several years.

The list of proprietors  dated Oct 13, 1660 also included Thomas Willett, later to be the first Mayor of New York City.
The conflicting purchase claims were settled in 1679, after Humphrey Atherton’s death. His son Jonathan Atherton 
 pushed the case on October 8, 1674 for continued support from Connecticut, seeking mutual interest to reassure the company’s rights to the land if Connecticut bolstered its claim to land  to the east of Stonington, Connecticut. Jonathan Atherton sold his shares in 1676 to John Saffin
and Thomas Dean and all his rights to Narragansett Neck.

The company, which by then had changed its name to "Proprietors of the Narragansett Country," eventually did sell  of the land to Huguenot immigrants who began a colony there called Frenchtown. The Huguenots lost the land when, in 1688, a Royal Commission determined the Atherton claim to be illegal. However the dispute remained ongoing in 1708.

Neighboring land speculation
John Hull, along with other Boston Merchants acquired a land grant in 1657, south of Wickford, known as the Pettaquamscutt Purchase, (later South Kingstown) from the Indian sachems in 1657. Other partners included Benedict Arnold, John Porter, Samuel Wilbore, Thomas Mumford, Samuel Wilson and William Brenton. This preceded the Atherton Trading Company. It too was declared illegal by the Royal Commission of 1688.

Some documents refer to there being an overlap with the two claims.

Further reading

 Dunn, Richard S. “John Winthrop, Jr., and the Narragansett Country.” The William and Mary Quarterly, vol. 13, no. 1, 1956, pp. 68–86. JSTOR, www.jstor.org/stable/1923390
 
 Colonial Records of Rhode Island, 2: 464. Francis Jennings, The Invasion of America: Indians, Colonialism, and the Cant of Conquest (Chapel Hill, NC: University of North Carolina Press, 2010), 279. Howard Chapin, Sachems of the Narragansetts, (Providence, RI: Rhode Island Historical Society, 1931), 68. Samuel Gardner Drake, The Book of the Indians (Boston: Josiah Drake, 1833), 2: 58. John Fredrick Martin, Profits in the Wilderness: Entrepreneurship and the Founding of New England Towns in the Seventeenth Century (Chapel Hill, NC: University of North Carolina Press, 1991), 62-73. James N. Arnold, The Records of the Proprietors of the Narragansett, or FONES RECORD (Providence: Narragansett Historical Publishing Co., 1894), 1:1.
 John Russell Barlett, Records of the Colony of Rhode Island and Providence Plantations (Providence: A. Crawford Greene and Brother, 1856–65), 1:465. Arnold, Fones Record, 1:5-16. Chapin, Sachems, 70-4. Drake, Book of the Indians, 2:81. Richard Dunn, “John Winthrop, Jr. and the Narragansett Country,” The William and Mary Quarterly, Third Series, 13:1 (Jan. 1956): 68-74, http://www.jstor.org/stable/1923390. Jennings, Invasion, 276, 279. Martin, Profits, 68-9. Paul Robinson, “The Struggle Within: The Indian Debate in Seventeenth-Century Narragansett Country” (Ph.D. diss., State University of New York at Binghamton, 1990), 161-2, 179-80.
 Jennings, Invasion, 276. Chapin, Sachems, 71. Drake, Book of the Indians, 2:81. Robinson, “The Struggle Within,” 161-2, 179-80.
 Jennings, Invasion, 279. Dunn, “Winthrop,” 68-74. Martin, Profits, 68-9. Arnold, FONES RECORD, 1:5-16.
 Society of Colonial Wars, The Narragansett Mortgage: the Documents Concerning the Alien Purchases in Southern Rhode Island (Providence, RI: E. R. Freeman Company, 1926), 35. Jennings, Invasion, 278-86. Dunn, “Winthrop,” 70-1, 74. On Mason-Winthrop rivalry, see David W. Conroy, "The Defense of Indian Land Rights: William Bolan and the Mohegan Case in 1743." Proceedings of the American Antiquarian Society 103 (1993), 403.
  Rhode Island Records, 1: 36-8, 435. Jennings, Invasion, 278-86. Drake, Book of the Indians, 2: 58. Dunn, “Winthrop,” 74. 
 RI Records, 1:418, 1:38.

External links
Memoirs concerning the French settlements and French settlers in the colony of Rhode Island
Founding of New England

References

History of the Thirteen Colonies
British companies disestablished in 1820
Chartered companies
Defunct companies of England
Trading companies of England
History of Massachusetts
Narragansett, Rhode Island
History of Rhode Island
History of Connecticut
Defunct companies of the United Kingdom
Companies established in 1659
Companies disestablished in the 1680s
Trading companies of the United States
Trading companies established in the 17th century